Elliott R. Blackstone (November 30, 1924 – October 25, 2006) was a sergeant in the San Francisco Police Department, known as a longtime advocate for the lesbian, gay and transgender community in that city.

Early life
Born in Aurora, Illinois and raised in Chinook, Montana, Blackstone served in the U.S. Navy during World War II, and was honorably discharged.  In 1949, he became a San Francisco police officer. He was a pioneer of what later became known as community policing.  In 1962, he was designated as the department's first liaison officer with the "homophile community," as it was then called.  Blackstone worked within the police department to change policy and procedures directed against the LGBT community, such as entrapment of gay men in public restrooms.

LGBT advocacy
Throughout the 1960s and early 1970s, Blackstone worked closely with local LGBT activist groups such as the Mattachine Society, Daughters of Bilitis, the Vanguard gay youth group, the National Transsexual Counseling Unit, and the Council on Religion and the Homosexual. Blackstone even took up a collection at his church to buy hormones for transgender people, at a time when city-funded health clinics would not provide hormones to them.

Blackstone was also involved in many other church and community activities, and taught community policing courses at the College of Marin.  At his retirement dinner in 1975, he was saluted by LGBT community leaders for his advocacy and support.  In 2005, an interview with Blackstone was featured in Screaming Queens, a documentary about the 1966 Compton's Cafeteria riot.  According to one source,

At the 2005 world premiere at the Castro Theater, Blackstone received a standing ovation from a sold-out crowd of more than 1000 people, when he answered an audience member's question; asked why, as a straight man, he had worked so hard on behalf of LGBT rights, he said, "Because my religion teaches me to love everybody."

In June, 2006 Blackstone received commendations for his longtime advocacy work from the California State Senate, the California State Assembly, the San Francisco Police Commission, and the San Francisco Human Rights Commission. The Pride Foundation of San Francisco named him Lifetime Achievement Grand Marshal for the 2006 Gay Pride Parade.

Death
Blackstone died of a stroke in 2006.

See also

Compton's Cafeteria riot

References

External links
Obituary of Sgt. Blackstone,  San Francisco Chronicle
Elliot Blackstone interview by Susan Stryker (1996)
Compton's Cafeteria riot web site
"San Francisco Pride Announces Sergeant Elliot Blackstone Lifetime Achievement Grand Marshal"
"Pride Parade Salute for an Unlikely Ally," San Francisco Chronicle

1924 births
2006 deaths
People from Chinook, Montana
United States Navy sailors
American LGBT rights activists
United States Navy personnel of World War II
San Francisco Police Department officers
20th century in San Francisco
Activists from California
People from Aurora, Illinois